Harold Ellerington (birth registered fourth ¼ 1912 – 1986), also known by the nickname of "Elmo", was an English professional rugby league footballer who played in the 1930s and 1940s.

Background
His birth was registered in Sculcoates district, Kingston upon Hull, East Riding of Yorkshire, England.

Playing career

International honours
Harold Ellerington won caps for England while at Hull in 1938 against France, and in 1939 against France.

County honours
Harold Ellerington represented Yorkshire while at Hull.

Championship final appearances
Harold Ellerington was away on the 1936 Great Britain Lions tour, and so didn't play in Hull FC's 21–2 victory over Widnes in the Rugby Football League Championship Final during the 1935–36 season, he received a winners medal for his 31-appearances that season.

County Cup Final appearances
Harold Ellerington played , was captain and man of the match in Hull FC's 10–18 defeat by Huddersfield in the 1938–39 Yorkshire County Cup Final during the 1938–39 season at Odsal Stadium, Bradford on Saturday 22 October 1938, in front of a crowd of 28,714.

References

External links
Statistics at hullfc.com
The Final Vote For Hall Of Fame On Now
Black And White Heroes
This Week In … This Week in 1930

1912 births
1986 deaths
English amputees
England national rugby league team players
English rugby league players
Great Britain national rugby league team players
Hull F.C. captains
Hull F.C. players
People from Sculcoates
Rugby league centres
Rugby league five-eighths
Rugby league fullbacks
Rugby league halfbacks
Rugby league locks
Rugby league players from Kingston upon Hull
Rugby league props
Rugby league wingers
Yorkshire rugby league team players